The FIH Women's World Rankings is a ranking system for women's national teams in field hockey. The teams of the member nations of International Hockey Federation (FIH), field hockey's world governing body, are ranked based on their game results. The rankings were introduced in October 2003.

Current rankings

Uses of the rankings
The rankings were introduced to overcome the criticism of fixing when drawing the pools for each tournament. It also determines the quotas for tournaments such as the Olympic Games and the World Cup.

Calculation method

Overview
All of the FIH-recognised, including qualifying and continental matches played in last four years are included in ranking points calculation. However, the past results will be deducted by the percentage set by the FIH as shown by the tabulation below:

Continental championships method
FIH had set allocated ranking points for all the continental tournaments. However, a different percentage of points for every continent raised questions about the system. Only Europe had full 100% points allocation for all classifications while the others had only several finishers with full points allocation. Africa was the sole continent with neither men's or women's tournaments having full points allocation regardless of the classifications.

New calculation method
From 2020 onwards, the FIH rolled out a new match-based world rankings system similar to the ones being used in rugby union and association football.

Rank leaders

See also
FIH Men's World Ranking

References

External links
FIH World Rankings

International Hockey Federation
Sports world rankings